Grace Presbyterian Church may refer to:
 Grace Presbyterian Church of New Zealand
 Grace Presbyterian Church (Peoria, Illinois)
 Local congregations in various Presbyterian churches

Grace Presbyterian Church